Paul Wolff may refer to:
 Paul Wolff (screenwriter), American screenwriter, actor and producer
 Paul Wolff (audio engineer), American electronics engineer and entrepreneur

See also
 Paul Wolf, American swimmer
 Paul Wolf (architect), German architect
 Paul Wolfe, American NASCAR crew chief and driver